Something Blue refers to a tradition about what brides should wear on their wedding day. 

Something Blue may also refer to:

Books
Something Blue (novel), a 2006 book by Emily Giffin
Something Blue, by Ann Hood 1991
Something Blue, by Jenna Jameson 2008

Film and TV
Something Blue (film), a movie based on the Emily Giffin novel
"Something Blue" (Buffy the Vampire Slayer), a 1999 episode of the American television series Buffy the Vampire Slayer
"Something Blue" (How I Met Your Mother), a 2007 episode of the American television series How I Met Your Mother

Music
Something Blue (Paul Horn album), a 1960 jazz album by Paul Horn
Something Blue (Lightnin' Hopkins album), a 1967 blues album by Lightnin' Hopkins
Something Blue (Chara album), a 2005 album by Chara
Something Borrowed - Something Blue, a 1966 album by Gerry Mulligan
"Something Blue", a 1962 Elvis Presley song, from the album Pot Luck

See also
 Something old
 Something New (disambiguation)
 Something Borrowed (disambiguation)